Tlacotepec is a city and seat of the municipality of General Heliodoro Castillo, in the state of Guerrero, south-western Mexico. 

Home to many ranchos called Aguacate, El Limoncito,Huautla,Ojo de Agua, Tepehuaje,Tiquimil, Chichiltepec, Tepetlapa, Los Naranjos (El Amatito del Naranjo), Pelón Xóchitl,La Cucaracha (La Guadalupe),Las Piñas, and many more.

References

Populated places in Guerrero